Chamaita neuropteroides is a moth of the family Erebidae first described by George Hampson in 1894. It is found in Assam, India.

References

Nudariina
Moths described in 1894